Connecticut's 40th House of Representatives district elects one member of the Connecticut House of Representatives. It encompasses parts of Groton and Ledyard. It has been represented by Democrat Christine Conley since 2017.

Recent elections

2020

2018

2016

2014

2012

References

40